"Get Away/The Jolly Roger" is the ninth double A-side single by Vamps, and the second single from album Bloodsuckers released on August 20, 2014. The single reached number 3 on the Oricon chart.

‘The Jolly Roger’ was featured in the TV commercial for Nissan’s X-Trail SUV.

Format 

The single was released in 3 Type including Limited Edition A, Limited Edition B, and Regular Edition. Limited Edition A came with CD and DVD which included music video and making of "Get Away". Limited Edition B came with CD and DVD including music video and making of "The Jolly Roger". Regular Edition only came with CD.

Music videos 

Music videos for "Get Away"'and "The Jolly Roger" were filmed in June 2014 at Hong Kong on the same day. "The Jolly Roger" was filmed first during the noon and then "Get Away" was filmed at night.

Tracklist

DVD (Limited Edition A)
 Get Away -MUSIC VIDEO-
 Get Away -MAKING-

DVD (Limited Edition B) 
 The Jolly Roger -MUSIC VIDEO-
 The Jolly Roger -MAKING-

References 

http://www.oricon.co.jp/prof/artist/454295/ranking/cd_single/

2014 singles
Japanese rock songs
Songs written by Hyde (musician)
2014 songs